DVArchive is a program which allows users of the ReplayTV Personal Video Recorder (PVR) to stream shows recorded on networked ReplayTVs to their PC for archiving and/or viewing. It can also stream archived video from the PC back to a ReplayTV to be watched there, allowing the PC to act as an expandable video library. DVArchive appears on the network as just another ReplayTV PVR.

DVArchive is a Java program and works on a variety of platforms including Windows 98/2000/XP, Mac OS X and Linux. DVArchive is freely distributed for non-commercial use. The current version is 3.2, released 7/12/2006. DVArchive 3.2 requires Java 1.4.2 or higher.

DVArchive stores TV programs on the PC in the same slightly non-standard MPEG2 format used by the ReplayTV PVR. Users may wish to edit these files and burn them onto video DVDs. The Replay MPEG2 format is understood by a number of widely used MPEG editors. There are also several DVD authoring programs that directly support MPEG2 inputs and minimize reformatting in converting them into DVD outputs.

Digital video recorders
Video software